Norwegian Jewel is a cruise ship operated by Norwegian Cruise Line (NCL). She is the lead vessel of NCL's  cruise ships and entered service in 2005. The vessel sails primarily in the western Pacific Ocean.

Design and description
Norwegian Jewel is NCL's first of four  ships. The vessel has a gross tonnage (GT) of 93,502 and measures .

Norwegian Jewel is powered by a diesel-electric propulsion system comprising five MAN-B&W 12V48/60B diesel engines providing power to two Azipod thrusters.

The ship had a capacity for 2,376 passengers as built with a crew of 1,100. This later grew to 2,394 passengers with a crew of 1,072. The vessel has 13 bars and lounges, 10 restaurants and a 1,037-seat theatre.

Construction and career

The cruise ship was ordered by NCL on 15 September 2003 constructed at the Meyer Werft Shipyard in Papenburg, Germany with the yard number 667. The keel laying ceremony took place on 28 October 2003. The vessel was launched on 12 June 2005 and completed on 4 August 2005. The ship was formally named Norwegian Jewel on 3 November 2005 in a ceremony at the Port of Miami, United States. Her godmother is Melania Trump, wife of business magnate Donald Trump and later the First Lady of the United States from 2017 through 2021. Norwegian Jewel was registered in the Bahamas on 1 August 2005 and  entered service in December of that year.

In an episode of The Apprentice, Donald Trump required his contestants to create a 30-second commercial of the ship, featuring both exterior and interior shots.

Norwegian Jewel underwent a dry dock refurbishment at Sembawang Shipyard in Singapore from 22 October to 5 November 2018. Norwegian Jewel was scheduled to spend the southern summer 2019–2020 undertaking cruises in Australia, New Zealand, Asia, and the South Pacific.

Coronavirus quarantine 

The cruise ship was stranded in the middle of the Pacific Ocean in 2020, after being denied entry into Papeete, French Polynesia and Lautoka, Fiji, due to fears of possible infection. On 19 March the 1,700 passengers were prevented from disembarking in Honolulu, Hawaii.

On 23 March, the passengers were allowed to disembark in Honolulu because the ship was experiencing mechanical problems. Passengers were able to catch chartered flights to return to their home locations. There were no confirmed cases of COVID-19 aboard the ship. The approximately 1,000 crew members were remaining on the ship as of 27 March. On 10 April, 42 Filipino crew members arrived in Manila.

Notes

Citations

References

External links

 NCL Norwegian Jewel
 Meyer Werft page on Norwegian Jewel
 Picture of the ship leaving the shipyard

 

2005 ships
Passenger ships of Norway
Ships of Norwegian Cruise Line
Ships built in Papenburg